Well known or Well-known is a phrase used in several technical contexts:

 Well-known ports, port number in the range from 0 to 1023
 Well-known text representation of coordinate reference systems, text markup language for representing coordinate reference systems
 Well-known text representation of geometry, text markup language for representing vector geometry objects
 Well-known trade mark, a status granted to famous international trade marks
 Well-known URIs, web services that use /.well-known/ URIs
 Notability, where the term is devoted from

See also